Iran Arvin (شركت ايران آروين) is an Iranian Construction & Engineering company.

History 

Iran Arvin was established in 1983 by a group of engineers and
professionals from different backgrounds in the public sector, private industry, and academia. Since its creation, the company has become known as one of Iran's leading firms in the industrial sector.
With a workforce of 250 permanent engineers and specialists along with an average 2,500 construction personnel, Iran Arvin cooperates extensively with international engineering companies, and sees the application of the most current international standards as its overarching priority.

External links
http://www.iranarvin.ir

Construction and civil engineering companies of Iran
Construction and civil engineering companies  established in 1983
Iranian companies established in 1983